Anacrabronina is a subtribe of square-headed wasps in the family Crabronidae. There are at least 4 genera and 120 described species in Anacrabronina.

Genera
These four genera belong to the subtribe Anacrabronina:
 Anacrabro Packard, 1866 i c g b
 Encopognathus Kohl, 1897 i c g
 Entomocrabro Kohl, 1905 i c g
 Entomognathus Dahlbom, 1844 i c g
Data sources: i = ITIS, c = Catalogue of Life, g = GBIF, b = Bugguide.net

References

Further reading

 
 
 

Crabronidae